Black Day may refer to

 Black Day (South Korea), an informal holiday in South Korea
 Black Day of the Indiana General Assembly, an 1887 event in Indiana, United States

See also